RTS/CTS (Request To Send / Clear To Send) is the optional mechanism used by the 802.11 wireless networking protocol to reduce frame collisions introduced by the hidden node problem. Originally the protocol fixed the exposed node problem as well, but modern RTS/CTS includes ACKs and does not solve the exposed node problem.

Frame format 
The RTS, CTS and ACK frame headers all contain a frame control field (two bytes of metadata flags), duration field, a field for the receiver MAC address, and a frame check sequence. Additionally, an RTS frame contains the transmitter's MAC address.

This protocol was designed under the assumption that all nodes have the same transmission ranges, and does not solve the hidden terminal problem.  The RTS/CTS frames can cause a new problem called the exposed terminal problem in which a wireless node that is nearby, but is associated with another access point, overhears the exchange and then is signaled to back off and cease transmitting for the time specified in the RTS.

RTS/CTS is an additional method to implement virtual carrier sensing in carrier sense multiple access with collision avoidance (CSMA/CA). By default, 802.11 relies on physical carrier sensing only, which is known to suffer from the hidden node problem.

The RTS/CTS packet size threshold is 0–2347 octets. Typically, sending RTS/CTS frames does not occur unless the packet size exceeds this threshold. If the packet size that the node wants to transmit is larger than the threshold, the RTS/CTS handshake gets triggered. Otherwise, the data frame gets sent immediately.

IEEE 802.11 RTS/CTS mechanism could help solve exposed node problem as  well, only if the nodes are synchronized and packet sizes and data rates are the same for both the transmitting nodes. When a node hears an RTS from a neighboring node, but not the corresponding CTS, that node can deduce that it is an exposed node and is permitted to transmit to other neighboring nodes. If the nodes are not synchronized (or if the packet sizes are different or the data rates are different) the problem may occur that the exposed node will not hear the CTS or the ACK during the transmission of data of its neighbor.

See also 
 RS-232 RTS/CTS - RS-232 RTS/CTS flow control
 Multiple Access with Collision Avoidance for Wireless

References

External links 
 "A New Channel Access  Method for Packet Radio" 
 

RTS CTS

de:Carrier Sense Multiple Access/Collision Avoidance#RTS/CTS Koordination